Jimmy Mwangangi Muindi (born August 14, 1973) is a marathon runner from Kenya.

Overview
Muindi started his marathon career by finishing 2nd at the Honolulu Marathon in 1997. Since then, he has been a perennial competitor at the Honolulu Marathon and has won it a record six times (1999, 2000, 2003, 2004, 2005, 2007). He set the course record of 2:11:12 hours in 2004, still valid in 2008.

He won the Rotterdam Marathon in 2005 setting his personal record of 2:07:50 hours. He also competed at the 2005 World Championships marathon race in Helsinki, Finland, but did not finish the race.

At the Chicago Marathon, Mundi finished 5th in 2003, 4th in 2004 and 3rd in 2006. At the Berlin Marathon, he finished 10th in 2001 and 5th in 2002.

Muindi is of the Kamba people. Muindi's sister Marietta is married to Patrick Ivuti, also a prominent Kenyan marathon runner.

Achievements

References

External links

Marathoninfo profile

1973 births
Living people
Kenyan male long-distance runners
Kenyan male marathon runners
Kenyan male steeplechase runners